Pinheiro Machado is a municipality in the state of Rio Grande do Sul, Brazil.

History
Pinheiro Machado is one of the most ancient towns in the state of Rio Grande do Sul. Until 1830, the area was owned by the city of Rio Grande. After it became a part of Piratini city, separating on February 24, 1879, by the name of Nossa Senhora da Luz, or Nossa senhora da Luz das Cacimbinhas.
The occupation of this town, according to records, began by the brigadier Rafael Pinto Bandeira, about 1765. The first inhabitants were the azorean Tomás Antonio de Oliveira and José Dutra de Andrade, who owned "allotments" (Portuguese: sesmaria (pt)) of land at Coxilha do Veleda, in 1790. According to the legend, Dutra de Andrade had lost his vision and then, he made a promise that if he would recover his vision washing his eyes on the miraculous water of the well located there, he would order the building of a chantry in honor of Nossa Senhora Aparecida and so, the miracle happened. After the chantry, a parsonage was created in 1851.

Geography

Relief
The relief, located in a plateau known as Serras de Sudeste, is a rather irregular, specially the Passarinho's Hill, Veleda's Hill and Asperezas Hill. Also highlights the formation of countless hills, mainly in the second district. The soil is characterized by shallow, with the presence of rock outcroppings.

Climate
Snowfalls are not uncommon in the city, and can occur about one or twice a decade. The last snowfalls occurred on September 4, 2006 and on September 5, 2008, with moderate snowfall during the afternoon. Frosts and sleet are more common.

References

Municipalities in Rio Grande do Sul